Kuntur Ikiña (Aymara kunturi condor, ikiña to sleep, bed or blanket, Hispanicized spelling Condoriquiña)  is a mountain in the Andes of Peru, about  high. It is located in the Puno Region, Puno Province, on the border of the districts Mañazo and Tiquillaca.

References

Mountains of Peru
Mountains of Puno Region